Cosmopterix bichromella is a moth in the family Cosmopterigidae. It was described by Sinev and Park in 1994. It is found on the Korean Peninsula.

References

Natural History Museum Lepidoptera generic names catalog

Moths described in 1994
bichromella